Ali Sadiki (born 10 December 1987) is a Zimbabwean professional footballer, who plays as a midfielder for Zambian club Kabwe Warriors and the Zimbabwe national team.

Career

Club
Sadiki's career began in Zimbabwe with Harare United, however his stay with them was short as he left due to the club going defunct. He subsequently joined South African second tier side Witbank Spurs, whom he left in 2010 to return to Zimbabwe to join Gunners where he remained until 2012 when he joined Platinum, after two years with Platinum he left Zimbabwe for the second time to sign for DR Congo club TP Mazembe on a five-year deal on 31 May 2014. Just over a year after signing for TP Mazembe, Sadiki was loaned out to Don Bosco.

International
In January 2014, coach Ian Gorowa, invited him to be a part of the Zimbabwe squad for the 2014 African Nations Championship.  He helped the team to a fourth-place finish after being defeated by Nigeria by a goal to nil. Six of Sadiki's eight Zimbabwe caps came in the 2014 African Nations Championship, while his only goal for his nation came in a 2013 friendly versus Mozambique.

Career statistics

International
.

International goals
. Scores and results list Zimbabwe's goal tally first.

Honours

Club
Gunners 
Zimbabwe Premier Soccer League (1): 2009

Platinum
 Zimbabwean Independence Trophy (2): 2012, 2014
 Cup of Zimbabwe (1): 2014

TP Mazembe
Super Coupe du Congo (1): 2014

References

External links

Ali Sadiki at Footballdatabase

Living people
1987 births
Zimbabwean footballers
Zimbabwe international footballers
Zimbabwean expatriate footballers
Zimbabwe A' international footballers
2014 African Nations Championship players
Witbank Spurs F.C. players
Gunners F.C. players
TP Mazembe players
CS Don Bosco players
Kabwe Warriors F.C. players
Zimbabwe Premier Soccer League players
Association football midfielders
Zimbabwean expatriate sportspeople in Zambia
Expatriate footballers in the Democratic Republic of the Congo
Expatriate footballers in Zambia
Zimbabwean expatriate sportspeople in the Democratic Republic of the Congo